General Bradshaw may refer to:

Aaron Bradshaw Jr. (1894–1976), U.S. Army major general
Adrian Bradshaw (born 1958), British Army general
Richard Bradshaw (British Army officer) (1920–1999), British Army lieutenant general
William Bradshaw (British Army officer) (1897−1966), British Army major general